Sports Hall Kumanovo is an indoor sport venue located in Kumanovo, North Macedonia. The hall has capacity of 6,500 seats and was built in 1980.

It is the biggest indoor sport hall in Kumanovo, where competitions of basketball, futsal, handball, volleyball and boxing matches  are held.

Events

See also
Kumani
KK Kumanovo
RK Kumanovo

References

Buildings and structures in Kumanovo
Sport in Kumanovo
Indoor arenas in North Macedonia
Multi-purpose stadiums in North Macedonia
Basketball venues in North Macedonia
Volleyball venues in North Macedonia